Randall T. Eng (born December 16, 1947) is an American judge who is the presiding justice of the New York Supreme Court, Appellate Division, Second Department.  Eng became the first Asian-American to serve as a presiding justice in New York State's history.  Born in Canton, China but raised in New York City, Eng attended public school before graduating from the State University of New York at Buffalo and St. John's University School of Law.  From 1970 to 2004, Eng served his country as a member of the New York Army National Guard, retiring as state judge advocate with the rank of colonel.

Early life and education 
  He grew up with his family in Queens, New York, where he attended New York City public schools.

Eng received a B.A. degree in political science from the State University of New York at Buffalo in 1969 and a J.D. degree from St. John's University School of Law in 1972. He has served in the New York Army National Guard and as a colonel in the Judge Advocate General's Corps.

Legal career 
Eng began his legal career in public service as an assistant district attorney in Queens and continued in top leadership positions at the New York City Department of Corrections.
He first took the bench in the Criminal Court of the City of New York in 1983.

In 1991, he presided in Supreme Court, Queens County courts where he served as Administrative Judge of the Criminal Term of Queens County Supreme Court starting in March 2007.

In January 2008 Eng was elevated to the Appellate Division.  Governor Andrew M. Cuomo appointed him to lead the Second Department as presiding justice in 2012 where he oversees one of the busiest appellate courts in the country.

After retiring from the bench, in January 2018, Eng joined the New York-based law firm Meyer, Suozzi, English & Klein, P.C. as Of Counsel to the Litigation Department, the Appellate Practice and Criminal Defense groups.

Notable achievements 
Eng is the first Asian American to serve as presiding justice of an Appellate Division.  He is also the first Asian-American justice in New York State.  In 2016, Eng gave the commencement address for St. John's Law School and was awarded an honorary degree.  In 2016 Eng also won the Daniel K. Inouye Trailblazer Award, NAPABA's highest honor, which recognizes the outstanding achievements, commitment, and leadership of lawyers who have paved the way for the advancement of other Asian Pacific American attorneys.

See also
List of Asian American jurists
List of first minority male lawyers and judges in New York

References

1947 births
Living people
American people of Chinese descent
County district attorneys in New York (state)
New York (state) Democrats
New York (state) lawyers
New York Supreme Court Justices
St. John's University School of Law alumni